CBS is an American television network.

CBS Television may also refer to:

 CBS Broadcast Center, the studio center and home of CBS News in New York City
 CBS Studio Center, a television and motion picture production facility in Los Angeles
 CBS Studio Building, the music recording venue in New York City
 Paramount Global Distribution Group, the global television distribution division
 CBS Media Ventures, a television distribution division
 CBS Studios, a television production division 
 CBS Films, the motion picture division
 CBS Home Entertainment, the home video entertainment division

See also 
 CBS (disambiguation)

Paramount Global